Sant Janābāi was a Marāthi religious poet in the Hindu tradition in India, who was born likely in the seventh or the eighth decade of the 13th century. She died in 1350.

Janabai was born in Gangākhed 1258-1350, Mahārāshtra to a couple with first names rand and Karand. Under the caste system the couple belonged to the matang. After her mother died, her father took her to Pandharpur. Since her childhood, Janabai worked as a maid servant in the household of Dāmāsheti, who lived in Pandharpur and who was the father of the prominent Marathi religious poet Nāmdev. Janabai was likely a little older than Namdev, and attended to him for many years.

Pandharpur has high religious significance especially among Marathi-speaking Hindus. Janabai's employers, Damasheti and his wife, Gonāi, were very religious. Through the influence of the religious environment around her and  her innate inclination, Janabai was always an ardent devotee of Lord Vitthal. She was also a talented poet. Though she never had any formal schooling, she composed many high-quality religious verses of the abhang (अभंग) form. Some of her compositions were preserved along with those of Namdev. Authorship of about 300 abhang is traditionally attributed to Janabai. However, researchers believe that quite a few of them were in fact compositions of some other writers.

Along with Dnyāneshwar, Nāmdev, Eknāth, and Tukaram, Janabai has a revered place in the minds of Marathi-speaking Hindus who belong especially to the wārakari (वारकरी) sect in Maharashtra. In accord with a tradition in India of assigning the epithet sant (संत) to persons regarded as thoroughly saintly, all of the above religious figures including Janabai are commonly attributed that epithet in Maharashtra. Thus, Janabai is routinely referred to as Sant Janabai (संत जनाबाई).

See also
 Backward-caste Hindu Saints
 Wārakari
 Women in Hinduism
 Bhakti movement
 Namdev
 Nivruttinath
 Dnyaneshwar
 Tukaram
 Eknath
 Sopan
 Muktabai
 Chokhamela
 Sant Soyarabai
  Gadge Maharaj 
 Sant Mat
 Pandharpur Wari – the largest annual pilgrimage in Maharashtra that includes a ceremonial Palkhi of Tukaram and Jñāneśvar.

References

External links
Janabai: Poems and Biography 

Medieval Hindu religious leaders
14th-century Indian poets
1350 deaths
Poets from Maharashtra
Warkari
Hindu female religious leaders
Indian women poets
14th-century Indian women writers
14th-century Indian writers
Women mystics
Marathi Hindu saints